Nambor Wildlife Sanctuary is a protected area located in Karbi Anglong district of Assam in India. This wildlife sanctuary covers an area of 37 km2. The area was declared as a sanctuary on 27 July 2000. It is located 25 km from Golaghat district and 65 km from the Kaziranga National Park. Together with Garampani Wildlife Sanctuary of Karbi Anglong and Nambor-Doigrung Wildlife Sanctuary of Golaghat distrcit it forms a larger complex of wilderness. The proposal for this sanctuary was made in 1993.

Biodiversity
Flora Bhelu, Gomari, Ajar, Nahor, Udiyam, Poma, Bonsum etc.  It harbors 51 rare species of orchid.

Mammals Chinese pangolin, slow loris, stump-tailed macaque, pig-tailed macaque,  Assamese macaque, rhesus monkey, capped langur, hoolock gibbon, tiger, leopard, clouded leopard, leopard cat, fishing cat, jungle cat, elephant, barking deer, sambar, wild pig, gaur, Malayan giant squirrel and Asian brush-tailed porcupine  

Birds Some noteworthy species found includes White-backed vulture, Slender-billed vulture, White-cheeked hill partridge, Grey peacock pheasant, Kaleej pheasant, Red junglefowl, White-winged wood duck, Green imperial pigeon, Great pied hornbill, Oriental pied hornbill, Wreathed hornbill, Hill myna among many others.

Reptiles Burmese rock python, king cobra and monitor lizards among others.

See also
 Garampani Wildlife Sanctuary
 Nambor - Doigrung Wildlife Sanctuary

References

External links
Nambor Wildlife Sanctuary at assaminfo.com.
Nambor Wildlife Sanctuary at wildlifeinindia.in.

Wildlife sanctuaries in Assam
Karbi Anglong district
Protected areas established in 2000
2000 establishments in Assam